The Puck Fair (Irish: Aonach an Phoic, meaning "Fair of the He-Goat", 'poc' being the Irish for a male goat) is one of Ireland's oldest fairs. It takes place annually from 10–12 August in Killorglin, County Kerry.

Description
Every year a group of people go up into the mountains and catch a wild goat. The goat is brought back to the town and the "Queen of Puck", traditionally a young school girl from one of the local primary schools, crowns the goat "King Puck".

The goat is then put into a small cage on a high stand for three days, and on the 3rd day of the fair, he is brought down to be led back to the mountains. In the middle of the town square,  he is crowned and this signifies that the festivities may begin. The pubs stay open until 3.00 AM which is a legal exception due to the fair as all bars in Ireland normally must close at 2.00 AM. This is a source of contention with the local police.

Markets
Tradition dictates that a horse fair takes place on the first day and on the second day there is a cattle fair. There are usually many street vendors during the festival who advertise their wares to the large numbers of tourists who come to Killorglin for the fair.

History
The fair itself is purported to be ancient but can only officially be traced back as far as 1613 when King James I issued a charter granting legal status to the existing fair in Killorglin. Despite this fact, its roots are still unknown, although there are several legends of its origins.

One of the legends of the fair is that the event pays tribute to a goat that broke away from its herd, while the rest of the herd headed towards the mountains, and warned the town's inhabitants while the “Roundheads” were pillaging the countryside around Shanara and Kilgobnet at the foot of the McGillycuddy Reeks. The advancing army of Oliver Cromwell during his conquest of Ireland in the 17th century triggered the pillages around the countryside. The goat's arrival alerted the inhabitants of danger, and they immediately set out to protect the town and their herds. This is explained in the traditional Irish ballad, An Poc ar Buile (the Mad Puck Goat).

Scholars speculate that the fair's origins stem from Pre-Christian Ireland, from the Celtic festival of Lughnasa which symbolised the beginning of the harvest season, and that the goat is a pagan fertility symbol.

In 1931, Margaret Murray tied the Puck Fair into her version of the witch-cult hypothesis, asserting that it was a pre-Christian festival in honour of the Horned God. However, historians Jeffrey B. Russell and Brooks Alexander have asserted that "Today, scholars are agreed that Murray was more than just wrong – she was completely and embarrassingly wrong on nearly all of her basic premises."

In 1941, a ballet entitled Puck Fair, based on a poem about the fair by F.R. Higgins, was staged at the Gaiety Theatre. The ballet was choreographed by Cepta Cullen and composed by Elizabeth Maconchy, with set design by Mainie Jellet.

The 2020 and 2021 festivals were cancelled due to the COVID-19 pandemic, but the event returned in 2022. High temperatures necessitated taking the goat down from its high stand for a number of breaks.

See also
 Gaelic Ireland
 Irish mythology

References

Footnotes

Sources

 

Cultural festivals in Ireland
Festivals in Ireland
Irish culture
Tourist attractions in the Republic of Ireland
Tourist attractions in Ireland by county
Festivals established in 1603
1603 establishments in Ireland
Summer events in the Republic of Ireland